This list of bridges in Latvia lists bridges of particular historical, scenic, architectural or engineering interest. Road and railway bridges, viaducts, aqueducts and footbridges are included.

Historical and architectural interest bridges

Major road and railway bridges 
This table presents the structures with spans greater than 100 meters (non-exhaustive list).

Notes and references 
 

 Others references

See also 

 Transport in Latvia
 List of national roads in Latvia
 Rail transport in Latvia
 Geography of Latvia

External links 

 
 

Latvia
 
Bridges
Bridges